Chup Laag is the incomplete studio album released by Nepalese rapper Laure (Nepalese rapper).This is the debut album by Laure with The Bad Kompany.

Track listing

Writing and recording 
Over a year ago Laure released a music video for Banawati for this album and he started teasing everyone in 2017 and released two of his music videos on YouTube but other music is yet to come.

Charts
Album

Songs in the Album

Members 
 Laure - vocals
 Uniq Poet - vocals

References 

2017 albums
Laure (Nepalese rapper) albums